The Chiltern Hundreds may refer to:
 Chiltern Hundreds, an ancient administrative area in Buckinghamshire, England
 Crown Steward and Bailiff of the Chiltern Hundreds, a position used as a procedural device to allow resignation from the House of Commons
 The Chiltern Hundreds (play), a 1947 play
 The Chiltern Hundreds (film), a 1949 film adaptation of the play